Between the Wars is an extended play released by Billy Bragg in 1985. It reached number 15 on the UK Singles Chart.

The title track was inspired by the UK miners' strike (1984–1985).  The choice of other songs on the record was also relevant to the dispute - "Which Side Are You On?" is an updated version of the American pro-trade union song of the same title from the 1930s, whilst "It Says Here" is critical of the political bias of British newspapers, most of which opposed the strike.

The proceeds from sales of the record were donated to the striking miners' fund.

All four tracks are available on the Billy Bragg compilation album, Back to Basics, and the 2006 reissue of Brewing Up with Billy Bragg.

Track listing
All tracks composed by Billy Bragg; except where indicated
 "Between the Wars"
 "Which Side Are You On?" (music by Florence Reece; new lyrics by Billy Bragg)
 "World Turned Upside Down" (Leon Rosselson)
 "It Says Here (Different Version)"

References

1985 EPs
Billy Bragg albums
Protest songs